Leo John Sheridan (April 24, 1897 – November 10, 1975) was a Chicago real estate executive, and United States Ambassador to Ireland (1968–1969).

Sheridan was born in Chicago, graduating from Lane Technical High School and then attending Kent College of Law and the University of Chicago. He served in the Army Signal Corps during World War I. In 1929, he founded his own real estate company – L.J. Sheridan & Co. – serving as president until becoming chairman in 1952. Active in the Catholic Church, he was named a Knight of St. Gregory in 1957.

In 1968, Sheridan was appointed ambassador to Ireland by President Johnson. After confirmation by the Senate, he presented his credentials to Irish leaders on November 1, 1968. He had the official title of Ambassador Extraordinary and Plenipotentiary, and served in the role until June 1, 1969. Sheridan died in 1975 in Lake Forest, Illinois.

References

Further reading
 
 
 

1897 births
1975 deaths
Ambassadors of the United States to Ireland
20th-century American businesspeople
United States Army soldiers
United States Army personnel of World War I